Anapoima is a Colombian municipality in the department of Cundinamarca located  from Bogotá.

History
The first inhabitants of the region were the Anapoymas Indians of the Panche nation. Between Tocaima and Tena there existed only small indigenous houses. The town was founded on August 10, 1627, by the Spanish counsellor Don Lesmes de Espinosa Saravia. With the passing of time, following Spanish colonisation, it became the resting place for travellers whose destination was the south of Colombia.

Geography
The town is located in the south west of the Cundinamarca Department, in the warm zone of the Tequendama province.

Town limits
To the north is located the town of La Mesa, to the south the towns of Apulo and Viota, to the east the town El Colegio, and to the west the towns of Jerusalén and Quipile.

Climate

Hymn
Fuiste cuna de Poimas y Anapoimas
Acoges a la inmensa humanidad
Te conviertes en toda una heredad
De quien viene a tus puertas a llamar

De la tribu Panche eres su hija
De los bravos Tolimas eres nieta
De la raza caribe heredera
Y de honrosa estirpe ancestral

Manantial de vida amor y paz
Salud de quien quiera en ti vivir
Amanecer de luz y de solaz
Aseguras eterno porvenir

Cuanto quieres a tus hijos
Y a quien te viene a buscar
Que amorosa le ofreces cobijo
Y hasta el alma le llegas a sanar (bis)

ANAPOIMA, ANAPOIMA
Sol de la eterna juventud
Author: Andrés Iriarte

References

External links
Population Retrieved on 200-07-22

Municipalities of Cundinamarca Department